Open Door is a programme produced by the BBC's Community Programme Unit. It was first broadcast on 2 April 1973 and ran for a decade. The programme gave people brief control of the airwaves and was a platform for the public to talk about its own issues and give their own views without editorial input from the BBC. The programme was later replaced by Open Space.

References

External links
Open Door programme made in 1974 about the community of Jericho, Oxford
One of us? Opening Doors In 1973, the BBC launched Open Door, a bold experiment in 'access' TV

BBC Television shows
Social anthropology
1970s British television series
1980s British television series
1973 British television series debuts
1983 British television series endings